Fall to Grace is a 2013 documentary film produced, filmed and directed by Alexandra Pelosi.

The film covers the career of former New Jersey Governor Jim McGreevey after his "fall from grace" that led to his resignation from political office in the wake of an extramarital affair, to his admission that he was a homosexual, and a bitter divorce battle.  In the years after his resignation, McGreevey pursued a calling to become an Episcopal priest, obtained a Master of Divinity degree at New York City's General Theological Seminary.  In recent years, McGreevey has counseled female inmates seeking rehabilitation at correctional facilities in the New Jersey and greater New York City area.

Fall to Grace was an official selection at the 2013 Sundance Film Festival and premiered on HBO on 28 March 2013. The film also opened the 2013 Golden Door Film Festival.

References

External links

American documentary films
2013 television films
2013 films
Documentary films about Christianity in the United States
HBO documentary films
Documentary films about American politicians
Politics of New Jersey
2013 documentary films
Films shot in New Jersey
Films set in New Jersey
Films directed by Alexandra Pelosi
2010s American films